Toshiko Akiyoshi Solo Live at the Kennedy Center is a live solo album recorded by jazz pianist Toshiko Akiyoshi.  It was recorded at the Kennedy Center in Washington DC and released in 2000 by Nippon Crown Records.

Track listing
"Count Your Blessings Instead of Sheep"
"I Got It Bad And That Ain't So Good"
"Improvisation In Five"
"Un Poco Loco"
"Deep River"
"Con Alma"
"Village"
"Repose"
"Just One of Those Things"
"Ten Ten"

References
Nippon Crown CRCJ-9153 
Toshiko Akiyoshi Solo Live at the Kennedy Center at [ Allmusic.com]

Toshiko Akiyoshi live albums
2000 live albums
Solo piano jazz albums